Michalis Kallergis (born 26 August 1996) is a Greek professional footballer who plays for Football League Greece side P.A.O. Rouf as an attacking midfielder.

Career

Club career
He played seven times for Apollon Smyrnis in Super League 1 and Football League Greece between 2015 and 2018.

In August 2020, Kallergis moved to Asteras Vlachioti.

References

External links

1996 births
Living people
Greek footballers
Association football midfielders
Olympiacos F.C. players
Apollon Smyrnis F.C. players
Kozani F.C. players
Egaleo F.C. players
Ionikos F.C. players
Football League (Greece) players